Ümit Kurt is a historian who studies the modern Middle East. Many of his publications are about the Armenian genocide. In 2016, he received a PhD in Armenian genocide studies from Clark University. Kurt is a Turkish citizen ethnically of Kurdish and Arab origin; he was born and grew up in Gaziantep.

Works

References

Historians of the Armenian genocide
Clark University alumni
Living people
People from Gaziantep
Year of birth missing (living people)
21st-century Turkish historians
21st-century male writers
Turkish male writers